Samuel Blumenfeld (born 1926 in New York, died 2015 in Waltham) was a phonics advocate and conservative writer. He frequently lectured in favor of systematic phonics instruction in the teaching of reading and wrote over a dozen books on education.

Biography

Growing up in the South Bronx, Blumenfeld saw combat in Italy during World War II and later graduated from the City College of New York. He published multiple books on education and spent much of his career investigating the decline in American literacy, the rise in learning disabilities in American children, sex and drug education, and other topics related to education. Blumenfeld was an advocate of homeschooling.

Blumenfeld was also active in the Shakespeare authorship question, theorizing in his 2008 The Marlowe-Shakespeare Connection that Christopher Marlowe may have written many of the works attributed to Shakespeare.

Published works

How To Tutor and Alpha Phonics outline Blumenfeld's preferred methods for teaching children basic school subjects.

Other published works include:

 N.E.A.: Trojan Horse in American Education

 Why Schools Went Public

 How to Tutor

 The Whole Language / OBE Fraud

 The Victims of Dick and Jane

 Alpha-Phonics: A Primer For Beginning Readers

 Homeschooling: A Parents Guide to Teaching Children

 New Illiterates and How You Can Keep Your Child from Becoming One

 Is Public Education Necessary?

 Property in a Humane Economy

 The Marlowe-Shakespeare Connection:  A New Study of the Authorship Question

 Crimes of the Educators: How Utopians Are Using Government Schools to Destroy America's Children (co-written with Alex Newman)

References 

1926 births

2015 deaths

American male writers

American academics

People from the Bronx

City College of New York alumni

United States Army Air Forces personnel of World War II